The Croatia national under-17 football team represents Croatia in international football for players aged 23 or under.

The team played its first match, a friendly against Hungary in 1993. Since its independence, Croatia participated in eight UEFA European Under-17 Championships: 1996, 1998, 1999, 2001, 2005, 2013, 2015 and 2017, hosted in Croatia. Croatia's greatest success at this tournament was third place in 2001. The team also finished fourth in 2005.

Croatia also participated at three FIFA U-17 World Cups since its independence: 2001, 2013 and 2015, where it was eliminated in quarter-finals, its biggest success so far in this tournament.

Competition history

UEFA European Under-16/17 Championship record 

Until the 1997 tournament, players born on or after 1 August the year they turned 17 years were eligible to compete. Since the 1998 tournament, the date limit has been moved back to 1 January.
In 2001/2002 the competition was renamed European Under-17 Championship, but the eligibility rules did not change.

FIFA U-17 World Cup record

Current squad 

 The following players were called up for the 2023 UEFA European Under-17 Championship qualification matches.
 Match dates: 20–26 October 2022
 Opposition: ,  and Caps and goals correct as of:'''15 September 2022, after the match against

Past squads
 1999 UEFA U-16 European Championship squad
 2001 UEFA U-16 European Championship squad
 2001 FIFA U-17 World Championship squad
 2005 UEFA U-17 European Championship squad
 2013 UEFA U-17 European Championship squad
 2013 FIFA U-17 World Cup squad
 2015 UEFA U-17 European Championship squad
 2015 FIFA U-17 World Cup squad
 2017 UEFA U-17 European Championship squad

See also 

 Croatia men's national football team
 Croatia men's national football B team
 Croatia men's national under-23 football team
 Croatia men's national under-21 football team
 Croatia men's national under-20 football team
 Croatia men's national under-19 football team
 Croatia men's national under-18 football team
 Croatia men's men's national under-16 football team
 Croatia men's national under-15 football team
 Croatia women's national football team
 Croatia women's national under-19 football team
 Croatia women's national under-17 football team

References

External links 

 UEFA Under-17 Official website
 Youth level statistics at the Croatian Football Federation official website 
 Croatia under-17 at Soccerway

Under-17
European national under-17 association football teams
Youth football in Croatia